The Lister Hospital in Chelsea is a private hospital in Chelsea Bridge Road, London. It is owned by the Hospital Corporation of America, the largest private operator of health care facilities in the world, and so is not part of the National Health Service.

History
Opened in 1985, the hospital occupies the former premises of the Lister Institute of Preventive Medicine; both were named in honour of Joseph Lister, 1st Baron Lister, a British surgeon considered to be the pioneer of aseptic surgery. It has 57 beds in inpatient wards on three floors and a six-bedded Critical Care Unit and specialises in orthopaedics, gynaecology, dermatology, gastroenterology, ophthalmology and plastic surgery, and also runs a fertility clinic. It generates revenue per bed of circa £1 million a year.

Services
Medical cannabis is available at the hospital in the clinic operated by Mamedica.

References

External links
 
 CQC report
 

1985 establishments in England
Alfred Waterhouse buildings
Grade II listed buildings in the City of Westminster
HCA Healthcare
Health in the Royal Borough of Kensington and Chelsea
Hospitals established in 1985
Hospitals in London
Private hospitals in the United Kingdom